Harvey is a census-designated place (CDP) in Marquette County in the U.S. state of Michigan. The population was 1,393 at the 2010 census.  The CDP is located within Chocolay Township.

Originally called Harvey Location, the community is a southwest suburb of Marquette at the junction of U.S. Route 41 and M-28.

Geography

Demographics

As of the census of 2000, there were 1,321 people, 565 households, and 346 families residing in the CDP. The racial makeup of the CDP was 93.79% White, 1.06% African American, 2.42% Native American, 0.61% Asian, 0.38% from other races, and 1.74% from two or more races. Hispanic or Latino of any race were 0.61% of the population.

There were 565 households, out of which 33.1% had children under the age of 18 living with them, 46.2% were married couples living together, 9.9% had a female householder with no husband present, and 38.6% were non-families. 34.3% of all households were made up of individuals, and 10.3% had someone living alone who was 65 years of age or older.  The average household size was 2.34 and the average family size was 3.00.

In the CDP, the population was spread out, with 25.8% under the age of 18, 8.4% from 18 to 24, 30.4% from 25 to 44, 24.1% from 45 to 64, and 11.3% who were 65 years of age or older.  The median age was 37 years. For every 100 females, there were 103.9 males.  For every 100 females age 18 and over, there were 102.5 males.

The median income for a household in the CDP was $37,321, and the median income for a family was $48,365. Males had a median income of $41,471 versus $25,536 for females. The per capita income for the CDP was $18,733.  About 2.9% of families and 7.0% of the population were below the poverty line, including 1.3% of those under age 18 and none of those age 65 or over.

References

Unincorporated communities in Marquette County, Michigan
Census-designated places in Michigan
Unincorporated communities in Michigan
Census-designated places in Marquette County, Michigan
Michigan populated places on Lake Superior